"Blue Guitar" is a song written by Burt Bacharach and Hal David. In 1963, Richard Chamberlain released it as the lead single from his album Twilight of Honor. It was a No. 12 hit on the Easy Listening chart and reached No. 42 on the Billboard Hot 100.

Background
Chamberlain's single is also notable for its B-side, another Bacharach-David composition entitled "(They Long to Be) Close to You." This is the original version of the song that became a number-one hit for the Carpenters in 1970.

It has been covered by Canadian actor Lorne Greene for his album The Ponderosa.

References

1963 singles
Richard Chamberlain songs
Songs with lyrics by Hal David
Songs with music by Burt Bacharach
1963 songs
MGM Records singles